Sergio Romano may refer to:
 Sergio Romano (writer), Italian journalist and diplomat
 Sergio Romano (futsal player)